The Montana Highway Patrol (MHP) is the highway patrol agency for the U.S. state of Montana, which has jurisdiction anywhere in the state over Montana Traffic law.

History

The Montana Highway Patrol was founded in 1935 after Montana led the nation with a 74% increase in highway fatalities. Twenty-four recruits taken from an application pool of over 1500 were selected to attend the first Highway Patrol Recruit Academy, and on May 1, 1935 those recruits took to the highways. Though authorized to enforce the eleven traffic laws in existence at that time, the Montana Highway Patrol's main focus was to educate and assist the public.

In 1988, they became the first state highway patrol in the nation to become nationally accredited. The accreditation process took three years to complete and was considered a critical element in enhancing the professionalism of the Montana Highway Patrol.

The Montana Highway Patrol currently have four specialty units that Troopers can be assigned to. They are:

• Executive Protection (EP)

• Special Response Team (SRT)

• Criminal Interdiction Team (CIT)

• Safety Enforcement Traffic Team (SETT)

The Montana Highway Patrol also operates an aviation divisions, which includes helicopter pilots and drone pilots.

In recent years there has been a movement by the citizens of Montana to restructure the Montana Highway Patrol into a State Police Agency; however, there has not been any formal conversations regarding this change.

Organization

The Montana Highway Patrol is divided into eight districts.

MCA 61-1-101  (28) "Highway patrol officer" means a state officer authorized to direct or regulate traffic or to make arrests for violations of traffic regulations.

Districts
There are seven districts that the MHP operates in throughout the state.

District I (Missoula) – Mineral, Missoula, Ravalli, and Sanders counties

District II (Great Falls) – Cascade, Fergus, Judith Basin, Petroleum, Teton, Wheatland, Blaine, Chouteau, Glacier, Hill, Liberty, Phillips, Pondera, and Toole counties

District III (Butte) – Beaverhead, Deer Lodge, Granite, Jefferson, Lewis & Clark, Madison, Powell, and Silver Bow counties

District IV (Billings) – Big Horn, Carbon, Stillwater, Musselshell, Golden Valley, and Yellowstone counties

District V (Glendive) – Carter, Custer, Daniels, Dawson, Fallon, Garfield, McCone, Powder River, Prairie, Richland, Roosevelt, Rosebud, Sheridan, Treasure, Valley, and Wibaux counties

District VI (Kalispell) – Flathead, Lake, and Lincoln counties

District VII (Bozeman) – Broadwater, Gallatin, Madison, Meagher, Sweet Grass, and Park counties

Mission

The Highway Patrol's mission is to safeguard the lives and property of the people using the highway traffic system of Montana through education, service, enforcement, and interagency cooperation.

The Patrol's 243 patrol officers cover great distances to police Montana's highways, assist other law enforcement agencies, and help motorists in need. Each year, the men and women of the Patrol:

drive more than 
respond to over 70,000 calls for service
issue more than 85,000 arrest tickets and more than 100,000 warning tickets

Patrol Officers provide public safety education presentations on nearly every subject related to driving safety, including seatbelt use, driving under the influence (DUI), and child safety.

Weapons

The Montana Highway Patrol uses a variety of lethal and non-lethal weapons, the weapons that are in use by the department are as follows:

 S&W MP 2.0 4.25” 9mm
 Beretta 1301 Tactical
 Rock River Arms M-4 Carbine style AR-15 MHP also have Military Surplus M-14 Rifles.
 OC (Oleoresin capsicum) Spray
 Taser X2

Fallen officers
Since the establishment of the Montana Highway Patrol in 1935, eight officers have died while on duty.

See also

 3-7-77
 List of law enforcement agencies in Montana
 State police
 State patrol
 Highway patrol

References

External links
 Montana Highway Patrol website

State law enforcement agencies of Montana
Government agencies established in 1935
1935 establishments in Montana